Positive handling is a term used in British primary and special-needs education for physical restraint. It has been described as "risk-reduced physical interventions that form part of the holistic response" The term has been in use since at least 2000.

Positive handling refers to a graduated approach that moves towards the control of extreme behaviour by adopting the least intrusive intervention for the shortest period of time to achieve the aim. It is one of the most efficient method of training on how to control a disruptive pupil whilst protecting them, and remaining compliant with legislation.

The objective of prevention and intervention techniques is to prevent school violence from occurring. Support for staff is the key to handling student aggression in schools.

To support it, the staff requires training, which is also a legal obligation of teaching institutions. The avoidance of any physical intervention is a first priority. The principle involves the graduated use of de-escalation approaches before resorting to physical intervention as the last resort, if any other approaches have failed or are likely to fail.

Using excessive force is abusive and unlawful, but the danger lies in the term “Minimum Force”. Unintentionally, we can enter a situation known as “The law of unintended consequence”.

Positive Handling is a statutory and mandatory training, in accordance to Section 2 and 3 of the Health and Safety at Work etc. Act 1974.

It represents a significant investment and undertaking for all staff. Increasingly, staff and managers have expressed the need to acknowledge existing understanding and experience due to raising violence in schools.

References

School and classroom behaviour